Urman-Bishkadak (Urman-Bişqaźaq) is a rural locality (a selo) and the administrative centre of Urman-Bishkadaksky Selsoviet, Ishimbaysky District, Bashkortostan, Russia. The population was 613 as of 2010. There are 7 streets.

Geography 
Urman-Bishkadak is located 11 km north of Ishimbay (the district's administrative centre) by road. Yar-Bishkadak is the nearest rural locality.

References 

Rural localities in Ishimbaysky District
Ufa Governorate